Taipa Grande is a hill located in Macau. The -tall hill is located on the island of Taipa.

See also
 Geography of Macau

References

Landforms of Macau
Taipa
Hills of China